Nanna's Cottage is a Christian children's television series created by husband and wife producing team Davey Porter and Karen Sponsler-Porter.

The series is about a 75-year-old grandmother Abigale "Nanna" Macaroon, a world traveler and archeologist, who gives away love and knowledge to her granddaughter and her friends about the world, and the importance of character. It featured adults, puppets and children, as well as regular guest characters. The television series was produced in Eugene, Oregon.

In 2020, Nanna's Cottage was featured in an edition of the Adult Swim webseries Bloodfeast.

Episodes
The first season of 13 episodes was broadcast between October 7, 2006 and January 13, 2007.  A second season was broadcast between April 7, 2007 and November 10, 2007.

Season 1

 Welcome to Cottage Hamlet
 Time Well Spent
 Happy Birthday, Arbuckle!
 The Great Cottage Hamlet Mystery
 Rushin' There and Russian Here
 Tick Tock Travelers 
 Everyone's A Winner
 Bookworms
 A Clean Sweep
 Music! Music! Music!
 Remember When?
 There's Never Enough Gus
 The Ones You Like the Best

Season 2 
 Spring Has Sprung
 Rosey's Friends
 Rosey's Cartoon Carnival 
 Gus Fixes Everything 
 Heather Horsetrotter
 A Lazy Day 
 A Really Busy Day

Monster Sunday School
Monster Sunday School is a series of shorts seen on TBN, filling the commercial breaks of Nanna's Cottage, featuring a basic Bible story lesson involving puppet monsters, a la Sesame Street. The shorts are generally two minutes in length, with three featured per episode. Nanna's Cottage's Marvin and Little Harry also appear. The shorts began airing with TBN's broadcast of Nanna's Cottage on October 7, 2006.

Cast

Rachael Rizzo as Nanna
Greg Izay as Gardener Gus (Absent: Tick Tock Travelers, A Clean Sweep and Rushin' There and Russian Here)
Lauren Stone as Aunt Trudy (Episodes: Tick Tock Travelers, Episode: Welcome to Cottage Hamlet, The Great Cottage Hamlet Mystery, Bookworms, Music! Music! Music!)
Gracie Porter as Rosey Smartidoodle (Episodes: Tick Tock Travelers, Welcome to Cottage Hamlet, A Lazy Day, A Really Busy Day, Happy Birthday, Arbuckle!, Rosey's Friends, Bookworms, Music! Music! Music!, A Clean Sweep, Rushin' There and Russian Here) 
C.J. Walker as Danny (Episodes: Tick Tock Travelers, Heather Horsetrotter, Welcome to Cottage Hamlet, A Lazy Day, A Really Busy Day, Happy Birthday, Arbuckle!, The Great Cottage Hamlet Mystery, Rosey's Friends, Bookworms, Music! Music! Music!, A Clean Sweep, Rushin' There and Russian Here)
Liza Clark as Heather Horsetrotter (Episodes: Tick Tock Travelers, Heather Horsetrotter, Welcome to Cottage Hamlet, A Really Busy Day, Happy Birthday, Arbuckle!, The Great Cottage Hamlet Mystery, Rosey's Friends, Bookworms, Music! Music! Music!, A Clean Sweep, Rushin' There and Russian Here)
Lydia Hale as Fu Cheng (Episodes: Heather Horsetrotter, Welcome to Cottage Hamlet, Happy Birthday, Arbuckle!, Bookworms, Music! Music! Music!) 
Spencer Hansen as Sasha Playnowski (Episodes: Heather Horsetrotter, Bookworms, Rushin' There and Russian Here)
Gaylord Walker as Larry Letterleaver (Episodes: Tick Tock Travelers, Time Well Spent) / The Moon Dudes (Episode: Welcome to Cottage Hamlet) / Gilbert Gadgetseller (Episode: Time Well Spent) / Go Go Man (Episodes: Time Well Spent & Music! Music! Music!)/ The Moon Men (Episode: Music! Music! Music!) / Franklin Ticketaker & Arlo Cartonpacker (Episode: Rushin' There and Russian Here)
Davey Porter as Mean Marvin Mister O Clock/Babylonian Boss (Episode: Tick Tock Travelers)
Jason Booth as Arbuckle (Episodes: Tick Tock Travelers, Heather Horsetrotter, Welcome to Cottage Hamlet, Time Well Spent, Happy Birthday, Arbuckle!, The Great Cottage Hamlet Mystery, Bookworms, A Clean Sweep, Rushin' There and Russian Here) / Cousin Arby (Episode: Happy Birthday, Arbuckle!)/ Chip the Sweep, Prize Patrol Guy and Puppy Arbuckle (Episode: Music! Music! Music!)
Bethany Smith as Bunny Hoppergrass (Episodes: Tick Tock Travelers, Welcome to Cottage Hamlet, A Really Busy Day, Happy Birthday, Arbuckle!, Bookworms, Music! Music! Music!, Rushin' There and Russian Here)
Austen Reeder as Andy Puddlesplash (Episodes: Welcome to Cottage Hamlet, Bookworms, Music! Music! Music!)
Carly Walker as Anna Belle Jingleheimer (Episodes: Welcome to Cottage Hamlet, A Really Busy Day, Happy Birthday, Arbuckle!, The Great Cottage Hamlet Mystery, Rosey's Friends, Bookworms, Music! Music! Music!, A Clean Sweep)
Joy Doctor as Beatrice Bookshusher (Episode: Bookworms)
Sal Collura as Babylonian Trainee (Episode: Tick Tock Travelers)
Eric A. Stillwell as The Moon King (Episode: Welcome to Cottage Hamlet)/ King of the Moon Men (Episode: Music! Music! Music!)
Dave Moppert as Little Harry (Episodes: Welcome to Cottage Hamlet, Time Well Spent, Happy Birthday, Arbuckle!, The Great Cottage Hamlet Mystery, Music! Music! Music!, A Clean Sweep, Rushin' There and Russian Here)
Evan Kossow as Little Harry (Episode: A Really Busy Day)
Don Moser as Benjamin Franklin (Episode: A Really Busy Day & Music! Music! Music!)
Ben Taube as Operissimo (Episode: Music! Music! Music!)
Ben Ballard as Christopher the Geography Boy (Episodes: Music! Music! Music!, Rushin' There and Russian Here)
Peter Noriega as Senor Cocina (Episodes: Music! Music! Music!, Rushin' There and Russian Here (Credited as Pete Noriega))
Savannah Booth as Lola Belle (Episode: Music! Music! Music!)
Cameron Booth as Jimmy (Episode: Music! Music! Music!)
Puppets by Pierre Gillette at Monsterpuppets

The Cottage Hamlet Kids (Episodes: Bookworms & A Clean Sweep)

Sora Boyd
Jake Hoffman
Zachary Hoffman
Callie Perlman
Sam Perlman

DVD releases
Some episodes of Nanna's Cottage have been released on DVD, from Digiview Entertainment.

Stations
The series has been aired on other television channels in the United States and Canada, including Trinity Broadcasting Network.

References

External links
 
 The Next Generation of Kid TV, Oregon Daily Emerald, November 16, 2006
 Child actors do their part for 'Nanna's Cottage' pilot. The Register-Guard, Eugene OR, October 1 2005

2006 American television series debuts
2007 American television series endings
2000s American children's television series
American television shows featuring puppetry
Christian children's television series
Trinity Broadcasting Network original programming
Culture of Eugene, Oregon
American children's education television series